Delphinium tricorne, known by the common names dwarf larkspur or spring larkspur, is a species of flowering plant in the Ranunculaceae (buttercup) family. It is native to the central and eastern United States, where it is the most common Delphinium found.

Description
There are a few alternate leaves along the stalk. All the leaves are grayish green to green, and deeply divided into about 5 lobes that are then each divided further into 2 or 3 secondary lobes.

The inflorescence is a raceme at the end of the stalk consisting of 6 to 24 flowers that are violet, blue, white, or a mixture of these colors. The flowers have 4 to 5 sepals and a long, narrow spur in the back.

Etymology
The genus name, Delphinium, comes from the Greek word for "dolphin", and may refer to the shape of the flowers. The specific epithet, tricorne, is Latin for "with three horns", which describes the shape of the fruit.

Distribution and habitat
D. tricorne is native in the United States from Nebraska to the west, Pennsylvania to the east, Alabama and Mississippi to the south, and Minnesota to the north. It is found in rich mesic forests, often over calcareous rocks.

Ecology
The plant is pollinated by bumblebees and hummingbirds, and several other species of bees visit the flowers for nectar and/or pollen.

Toxicity
The diterpenoid alkaloids lycoctonine and tricornine (otherwise known as lycoctonine-18-O-acetate) have been isolated from D. tricorne. The toxicology and pharmacology of lycoctonine have been quite well studied, but there is only limited information available concerning the biological properties of tricornine. Both alkaloids have neuro-muscular blocking properties, and D. tricorne should be treated as a potentially poisonous plant. This species has long been regarded as poisonous to livestock.

References

tricorne
Flora of the Appalachian Mountains
Flora of the Southeastern United States
Flora of the Northeastern United States
Flora of the North-Central United States